Metalworking hand tools are hand tools that are used in the metalworking field.  Hand tools are powered solely by the operator.

Slapper
Both metal and wood slappers are used for metalworking. Generally wood slappers are covered with a leather-face. Slappers can be used to shrink, contour, and planish (smooth) the panel without leaving rough marks to clean up. The salapper controls more surface with each blow than a hammer can and is very easy to use because it has the same angle of attack as a body hammer. This means the user does not need to change their arm and hand position when moving from hammer to slapper. The slapper can be far more effective than the hammer for shrinking because its leverage gives greater mechanical advantage over the rough spots. The slapper is great for working metal over a T-stake or for gouging and planishing. A good slapper can make  radius bends and crowns quite well. A slapper works well with forming stakes and post dollies for lightly planishing and pulling cold shrinks.

Spoons
One of the finest finishing tools ever designed is the spring steel spoon. It is widely known for its wide variety of uses, and exceptional durability. When striking directly on thin or polished sheet while backing up with another contoured tool ( dolly, spike, etc.), the spoon will provide an accurate contoured surface.

Dollies

Dollies can be hand-held or mounted on a stake or post. Metal dollies come in a variety of sizes and shapes and are used for all types of hand-forming and planishing, shrinking, etc.

Forming bags
Also referred to as "soft dollies." Forming bags are usually filled with sand or lead shot and sewn very tightly out of a top-grade canvas or leather. A forming bag will allow you to "shrink" the metal without marking it if used correctly.

Mallets

Mallets used for metalworking usually have either wood or plastic faces.  These "faces" come in a variety of shapes, such as flat, torpedo, hemispheric, or square in shape. The different faces (and material the mallet is made of)  allow you to work and/or shrink different metals.  For instance, the flat face can be used for planishing and smoothing and for hand shrinking thicker soft metals. Whereas a large hickory "torpedo mallet's" striking weight makes it best suitable for shaping soft metals such as aluminum or copper, but a similar torpedo mallet made from heavy black rubber has a striking weight which is best used for shaping steel.

Hammers

A wide range of body hammers are used in metalworking. Hammers range from small, lightweight "pick" hammers (that provide stubby pick point and high-crown peen-type faces that will ding out small dents in high fins), to specialty hammers and heavy-duty "bumping" hammers for heavy gauge truck fenders and panels. There are dozens of hammers that are designed for specific tasks or metal thicknesses.

Files and rasps

These tools are used to provide a smooth finish for detail work, and are often used in metalwork done for the aircraft and aerospace industry.

Snips or shears

Snips and shears are used for cutting metal. Various types of snips and shears are used for different metals and thicknesses. Some shears allow longer or shorter cuts depending on the shear's style. Certain types of snips and shears are recommended for aviation metalworking.

Marking and layout tools

Marking and layout tools are essential to metalwork. A profile gauge is frequently used by metalworkers to copy curves.

See also
Knockout punch
Screw extractor
Set tool

References

  ?